The Shareholder Executive (ShEx) was a body within the UK Government responsible for managing the government's financial interest in a range of state-owned businesses for commercial rather than political interests. It was part of the Department for Business, Innovation and Skills and staffed by civil servants, many of whom were corporate finance professionals with private sector experience. It was led by Mark Russell as Chief Executive at the time of its closure.

Role 
The Shareholder Executive managed a portfolio of businesses with a combined turnover of around £12 billion. The businesses varied and could be in the form of a limited company, public limited company, limited liability partnership, statutory corporation, trading fund, executive agency, non-departmental public body or non-ministerial government department. 

It advised the government on drafting parts of the Postal Services Act 2011 and worked on the privatisation of Royal Mail and the possible mutualisation of Post Office Ltd. It was also involved in establishing the UK Green Investment Bank, the Public Data Group and the British Business Bank.

It was not responsible for the government's shares in UK banks, which were managed by UK Financial Investments (UKFI), or the government's property holdings, which were managed by the Government Property Unit (GPU).

History 
The Shareholder Executive was originally established in September 2003 as part of the Cabinet Office. In 2004 it moved to the Department of Trade and Industry (DTI). 

In 2007 the National Audit Office published a report into the Shareholder Executive. This was broadly positive but had some misgivings about its location in the DTI.

Following the split of the DTI in 2007, ShEX moved to the Department for Business, Enterprise and Regulatory Reform (BERR) and then to its successor, the Department for Business, Innovation and Skills (BIS) in 2009.

The Shareholder Executive was originally involved in the government's nationalisation of Northern Rock and Bradford & Bingley at the start of the banking crisis in 2008. It then began the process of splitting off Northern Rock's 'bad bank' mortgage business to form Northern Rock. All bank shareholdings were transferred to UK Financial Investments in November 2008.

In 2011 the Government Property Unit was moved from the Shareholder Executive to the Cabinet Office as part of the new Efficiency and Reform Group.

In 2015, the government announced that the Shareholder Executive would be transferred to HM Treasury and became subsidiary of UK Government Investments, along with UK Financial Investments. This was due to occur with the end of the government fiscal year on 1 April 2016.

Portfolio Unit 
The Portfolio Unit contains businesses where the Shareholder Executive have a shareholding mandate, although the shares themselves are owned by government departments. Its role is either accountable to ministers directly ('executive'), working alongside shareholding teams within departments ('joint team') or advising department shareholder teams ('advisory'). Most businesses are wholly owned by the government, but some are partly owned.

Department for Business, Energy and Industrial Strategy 

Companies House
Insolvency Service
Land Registry
Met Office
Ordnance Survey
Post Office
UK Export Finance
UK Green Investment Bank
Urenco (33.3%)

Department for Culture, Media and Sport 

Channel Four Television Corporation

Department for International Development 

CDC Group

Department for Transport 

London and Continental Railways
NATS Holdings (49%)

Department for Work and Pensions 

Working Links (33.3%)

Department of Energy and Climate Change 

National Nuclear Laboratory
Nuclear Decommissioning Authority
Nuclear Liabilities Fund

HM Treasury 

Royal Mint

Ministry of Defence 

UK Hydrographic Office

Corporate Finance Practice 
The Corporate Finance Practice contains businesses where the Shareholder Executive has no clear shareholding mandate and its only role is to provide advice to the relevant government department.

Department for Business, Innovation and Skills 

Student Loans Company

Department for Culture, Media and Sport 

Public Sector Spectrum

Department of Health 

Bio Products Laboratory (20%)
Community Health Partnerships
NHS Professionals
NHS Shared Business Services (50%)

Ministry of Defence 

Defence Science and Technology Laboratory
Defence Storage and Distribution Agency
Defence Support Group
Oil and Pipelines Agency

Former businesses 
The Shareholder Executive has previously been responsible for a number of other businesses that have since either been sold, moved to other areas of government or dissolved.
Actis – remaining stake sold in 2012
Army Base Repair Organisation – merged into Defence Support Group in 2008
Bradford & Bingley – moved to UKFI in 2008
British Energy – remaining stake sold during takeover by EDF Energy in 2009
British Nuclear Fuels – broken up and ceased activities in 2009
British Waterways – removed from portfolio to become charitable trust in 2012
Defence Aviation Repair Agency – merged into Defence Support Group in 2008
Eurostar – remaining stake sold in 2015
Fire Service College – removed from portfolio in 2007
Forensic Science Service – dissolved in 2012
Covent Garden Market Authority – moved to Government Property Unit in 2011
Northern Ireland Water removed from portfolio in 2010
Northern Rock – moved to UKFI in 2008
Northern Rock (Asset Management) moved to UKFI in 2008
Qinetiq – remaining stake sold in 2008
Queen Elizabeth II Conference Centre – moved to Government Property Unit in 2011
Partnerships UK – dissolved in 2011
Royal Mail – remaining stake sold in 2015
Scottish Water – removed from portfolio in 2011
The Tote – sold to Betfred in 2011
UK Atomic Energy Authority – commercial business unit sold to Babcock International Group in 2009

See also 
UK Financial Investments

References

External links 
 
 Shareholder Executive annual review 2013 to 2014
 Shareholder Executive annual review 2014 to 2015

Corporate governance in the United Kingdom
HM Treasury
Public bodies and task forces of the United Kingdom government
2003 establishments in the United Kingdom
Shareholders